The Laotian langur or white-browed black langur (Trachypithecus laotum) is a species of primate in the family Cercopithecidae. It is endemic to Laos. Its natural habitat is subtropical or tropical dry forests. Genetically the Indochinese black and Hatinh langurs are very close to the Laotian langur, and consequently it has been suggested they should be considered subspecies of it.

References

Laotian langur
Endemic fauna of Laos
Mammals of Laos
Primates of Southeast Asia
Vulnerable fauna of Asia
Laotian langur
Laotian langur
Taxonomy articles created by Polbot